Scott C. Beardsley is an American-French professor and academic administrator. He serves as the dean of the Darden School of Business at the University of Virginia, where he is also the Charles C. Abbott Professor of Business.

Early life
Scott C. Beardsley was born in Maine and grew up in Vermont and Alaska. He is of British descent.

Beardsley graduated from Tufts University, where he earned a Bachelor of Science in electrical engineering. He subsequently earned a master in business administration from the MIT Sloan School of Management. He earned a doctorate of education in Higher Education Management from the University of Pennsylvania in 2015.

Career
Beardsley worked for McKinsey & Company for 26 years. He joined their New York City office in 1989, and was transferred to their office in Brussels, Belgium in 1991. He became a partner in 1995, and a senior partner in 2000. He served as McKinsey's head of talent development and co-founder of the McKinsey Academy.

Beadsley succeeded Robert Bruner as the dean of the Darden School of Business at the University of Virginia in August 2015. He is also the Charles C. Abbott Professor of Business at UVA.

Beardsley is the former chair of the American Chamber of Commerce in Belgium.

Personal life
Beardsley is married to Claire Dufournet, a native of Annecy, France. He is a dual US-French citizen.

References

Living people
American people of British descent
Tufts University School of Engineering alumni
MIT Sloan School of Management alumni
University of Pennsylvania Graduate School of Education alumni
McKinsey & Company people
University of Virginia faculty
Business school deans
Year of birth missing (living people)
American university and college faculty deans
French university and college faculty deans